The Kategoria Superiore Talent of the Year is an annual award given to the most talented player of the Kategoria Superiore by association "Sporti Na Bashkon". This award was established in the 2008–09 season.

Winners

Number of awards per player

See also
Albanian Footballer of the Year
Kategoria Superiore Player of the Month

References
 

Footballers in Albania
Albanian awards
Annual events in Albania
Association football player non-biographical articles